The Batley Bulldogs are an English professional rugby league club in Batley, West Yorkshire, who play in the Championship. Batley were one of the original twenty-two rugby football clubs that formed the Northern Rugby Football Union in 1895. They were League Champions in 1924 and have won three Challenge Cups.

History

Early years
Batley Cricket Club decided to have a rugby football side merge with them at their ground under the name Batley Cricket Athletic and Football Club. The two local rugby teams, Batley Mountaineers and Batley Athletic, played a challenge match at the cricket club's Mount Pleasant home on 23 October 1880 to determine which was the town's premier rugby side and worthy of the cricket club. Both sides claimed victory but the cricket club chose Batley Athletic to join them.

The new club's first game was at home against Bradford Zingari which they won by 2 goals, 3 touchdowns, 2 dead balls and one touch goal to nil. Jacob Parker scored the first touchdown. The first season finished with Batley having won 15 games and drawn 5 out of 26 matches played.

They won the Yorkshire Challenge Cup in 1884 – 5 season beating Heckmondwike, Pudsey, Halifax, Salterhebble and Bradford before beating Manningham 8 minor points to 2 in the final held at Cardigan Fields in Leeds.

After the 1890–91 season, Batley along with other Yorkshire Senior clubs Bradford, Brighouse, Dewsbury, Halifax, Huddersfield, Hull, Hunslet, Leeds, Liversedge, Manningham and Wakefield decided that they wanted their own county league starting in 1891 along the lines of a similar competition that had been played in Lancashire. The clubs wanted full control of the league but the Yorkshire Rugby Football Union would not sanction the competition as it meant giving up control of rugby football to the senior clubs.

Batley were one of the original twenty-two clubs that met at the George Hotel, Huddersfield on 29 August 1895 and formed the Northern Rugby Football Union. Batley's first match under the new union was on 7 September 1895 against Hull F.C. at Mount Pleasant with Batley winning 7–3.

Sixth in the Yorkshire Senior Competition of 1896/97, they battled their way to third spot come the end of the next season. Where knock-out competitions was concerned, they were peerless. In 1897, the 'Gallant Youths' became the first winners of the Challenge Cup beating St. Helens 10–3, in front of a crowd of 13,492 at Headingley. Batley retained the trophy by beating Bradford Northern on the corresponding weekend the following year at Headingley in front of 27,941 spectators, which was then a record gate for a rugby match.

The club were Yorkshire League winners in 1898/99 and in 1900/01 won the Challenge Cup for the third and last time to date; once again Headingley was the venue as Batley defeated Warrington 6–0.

Wharton 'Wattie' Davies set club records for most appearance, goals and points between 1896 and 1912. Batley's next cup triumph came on 23 November 1912 when Hull were defeated 17–3 at Headingley in Batley's one and only Yorkshire County Cup win.

Became a Limited Company Batley Cricket Athletic and Football Club Ltd in 1922

The 'Gallant Youths' reached the semi-final of the Yorkshire Cup and led the league in November 1923. Batley were crowned champions on Saturday 3 May 1924, lifting the Rugby League Championship Trophy for the only time in the club's history, after defeating Wigan 13–7 in the final. The club were also Yorkshire League winners that season.

The record attendance was set at 23,989 for the visit of Leeds for a third round Challenge Cup match on 14 March 1925.

Post Second World War

1952 saw a Yorkshire Cup final appearance against Huddersfield on 15 November. 'Fartown' running out 18–8 winners. The club's name was changed from Batley Cricket, Athletic & Football Club Ltd to its present official name of Batley Football Club Ltd in 1979.

The club celebrated its centenary in 1981 with a win over the league's new London team, Fulham.

In the 1960s the league was restructured into two divisions for two seasons before the single-division format was finally ditched in 1973 (there was also a three-season experiment with two divisions at the beginning of the 20th century). Batley are one of only a few teams never to make it into the top flight, although they came very close in 1993/94. The last match of the season against Doncaster came down to being a play-off for a spot in the first division, but Batley lost 10–5 in front of a capacity crowd of 4,500 at Mount Pleasant, and the chance was lost.

The local council suggested that Dewsbury and Batley ground share at Crown Flatt after refusing a grant towards safety repairs to Mount Pleasant in February 1987.

Batley looked set to join the elite in 1995 when they held off Huddersfield to finish in second place, just two points behind champions Keighley. The club succeeded in winning the Second Division Championship in the 1994–95 season. However, when the Super League was created for the following year, Batley along with Keighley were excluded. The club estimated that the decision cost them around £500,000.

Summer rugby era

Batley added 'Bulldogs' to their name for the 1996 season. The newly named Batley Bulldogs finished 1996 at the foot of Division One. Batley won the Trans-Pennine Trophy in 1998 beating Oldham in the final held at Mount Pleasant. Batley were also promoted from the Second Division that same season.

In 2003, Barry Eaton broke the world record for consecutive goal kicks.

The club underwent a major shake up in the coaching staff with the resignation of head coach David Ward due to pressure from some supporters in the form of derisory comments in the local press. The new coaching first team set up involved Gary Thornton as Head Coach, and assistant Paul Harrison.

After a tough season in 2005 Batley were into National League One relegation play-offs, facing bitter rivals and neighbours Dewsbury. Victory in the final saw Batley stay up against increasingly well funded sides with Super League ambitions.

2006 saw Batley start the campaign with little promise after a series of dismal performances in the Northern Rail Cup and the early rounds of National League One. However, coach Gary Thornton turned the side round and Batley made their way into the end of season play-offs. Jay Duffy's late drop goal sealed a 23–22 victory at Leigh to end the Lancastrians' own hopes of promotion and ultimately earn Thornton the honour of National League coach of the year. Batley failed to replicate this success in the next round, crashing to a 30–0 defeat at Whitehaven to put an abrupt end to their season.

After the previous season's mid-table finish 2009 started as a bad season for Batley. Gary Thornton resigned after a 60–22 loss on Easter Monday against Toulouse Olympique He was replaced by Karl Harrison. Batley stayed up after a 30–24 over Featherstone Rovers in which Batley were 14–0 down at one stage, they also beat Leigh, Widnes, Barrow, Whitehaven and Halifax.

2010 started for Batley with 5 wins and 1 draw in the Northern Rail Cup, including a record-breaking 100–4 win over Gateshead Thunder. Batley had a good run of wins in the Challenge Cup however they were defeated 74–12 by Catalans Dragons in the Quarter Final. Batley's Co-operative Championship season commenced well with wins over Keighley 22–12, Dewsbury 22–8, Whitehaven 54–6 and Widnes 35–16 to see the club finish in 7th position. Having finished top of their Northern Rail group section, the club entered the knock-out stages. A strong performance away at Leigh in the semi-final, where Batley were clear underdogs, put them into the final on 18 July 2010, where they beat Widnes with two late tries scored by Alex Brown. It was Batley's first silverware since 1998.

2011 saw Batley finish 3rd in the championship, later to be knocked out of the play-offs by Halifax, whom the Batley coach, Karl Harrison headed to take over for the 2012 season. Batley also took Huddersfield Giants close in their Challenge Cup quarter-final clash at Mount Pleasant. Batley had the lead throughout the game until Dane Manning was shown a red card at around 65 minutes for what many fans of both sides thought unfair. Huddersfield took the one man advantage and managed to outscore the Bulldogs in the last 15 minutes of the game.

2012 saw the arrival of John Kear taking over as head coach of Batley. Batley started 2012 winning the Northern Rail group which saw wins over Championship rivals Featherstone Rovers and Keighley. They also started the Championship season off strong with wins over Leigh, Dewsbury, York City Knights, Keighley and Halifax and a double over Hunslet but defeats came to Featherstone Rovers, Sheffield, Keighley at home, and Swinton Lions.

In April 2016 it was announced Matt Diskin was to take over at Batley Bulldogs from 2017 after John Kear announced he would be joining Wakefield Trinity as director of rugby in 2017.

Batley finished the 2021 Championship season in 4th place on the table and qualified for the playoffs.  The club would fall one match short of the Million Pound Game after losing 51–12 against Toulouse Olympique.
In the 2022 Championship season, Batley reached the Million Pound Game for the first time but were defeated 44–12 by Leigh.

Ground

The club play at Mount Pleasant which currently has a capacity of 7,500. 
It has a seated main stand, a large covered terrace behind one goal where the changing facilities are located, a small covered seated stand running approximately halfway down one touchline, with open terracing behind the other goal and to the side of the main stand.

Boards 
Batley Cricket, Athletic & Football Club Presidents 1880 – 1922

John W. Blackburn – 1880/April 1890, Dr William Bayldon – April 1890/April 1893, David Fox Burnley – April 1893/April 1899, James Goodall – April 1899/May 1903, William G. Isherwood – May 1903/June 1905, Harry Brook – June 1905/May 1906, Dan Brearley – May 1906/May 1907, J. Harry Spencer – May 1907/May 1909, Harry E. Whitaker – May 1909/May 1911, William H. Shaw – May 1911/May 1913, Samuel Brearley – May 1913/May 1918, John Frederick Whitaker – May 1918/May 1922

Batley Cricket, Athletic & Football Club Ltd Chairmen 1922 – 1979

John Frederick Whitaker – June 1922/May 1925, Ernest Kirk – May 1925/May 1926, Dr William W. Walker – May 1926/June 1927, John Frederick Whitaker – June 1927/May 1929, Arthur Summers – May 1929/July 1929, Dr Frank W. Smorfitt -August 1929/July 1930, Ernest Kirk – July 1930/May 1938, Rubert Asquith – July 1938/May 1940

No Official Chairman from May 1940/January 1942

John 'Jackie' S. Barritt – January 1942/October 1954, William W. Battye – October 1954/May 1955, John 'Jackie' S. Barritt – June 1955/April 1958, Ewart Earnshaw – April 1958/November 1967 & President – November 1967/June 1979, Leslie Driver – November 1967/June 1979

Batley Football Club Ltd Chairmen 1979 –

Peter S. Wilson – June 1979/February 1981, Michael J. Lumb – February 1981/March 1989, Stephen A. Ball – March 1989/May 1995 & President May 1995/January 1996, Ron Earnshaw – May 1995/June 1996 & President September 2007/October 2013, Trevor Hobson – June 1996/November 1997, Kevin M. Nicholas – November 1997/

2021 squad

2021 transfers

Gains

Losses

Players

Players earning international caps while at Batley

 Harry Bedford won caps for England (RU) while at Batley in 1889 against New Zealand Natives, and in 1890 against Scotland, and Ireland
 Joseph "Joe" Berry won caps for Scotland while at Huddersfield Giants, Doncaster, Rochdale Hornets, and Batley Bulldogs 1998...2003 4-caps + 3-caps (sub)
 George Brown won a cap for England while at Batley in 1945 against Wales
 George Davidge won a cap for England while at Batley in 1924 against Other Nationalities
 William "Will" T. Davies won caps for Wales (RL) while at Batley and Halifax 1909...1912 4-caps, and won a cap for Great Britain (RL) while at Halifax in 1911 against Australia
 Norman Field won a cap for Great Britain while at Batley in 1963 against Australia
 Isaac "Ike" John Fowler won a cap for Wales whilst at Batley, and won a cap for Other Nationalities whilst at Batley
Carl Gibson won a cap playing for Great Britain against France in 1985 in his final season at the club.
 Nathan Graham won caps for Scotland while at Bradford, Dewsbury, Featherstone Rovers and Batley 1998...2004 7-caps + 3-caps (sub)
 Frederick Hill won a cap for England while at Batley in 1909 against Wales
 Bill Hudson won caps for England while at Batley in 1946 against Wales and France, in 1947 against France, while at Wigan in 1949 against France, and won caps for Great Britain while at Wigan in 1949 against Australia

 Frederick Lowrie won caps for England (RU) while at Batley in 1889 against New Zealand Natives, and in 1890 against Wales
 David Luckwell won caps for Wales while at Hull Kingston Rovers, and Batley 1999...2000 3-caps (sub)
 Iain Marsh won caps for Scotland while at Oldham, Batley and Rochdale Hornets 2004...2007 5-caps + 3-caps (sub)
 Martin McLoughlin won caps for Ireland while at Wigan, Oldham and Batley and 2001...2008
 Joseph "Joe" Oliver, won caps for England while at Batley in 1928 against Wales, while at Hull in 1933 against Australia, in 1936 against Wales and France, and won caps for Great Britain while at Batley in against 1928 Australia (3 matches), and New Zealand
 George Palmer won a cap for England while at Batley in 1951 against Other Nationalities
 Lee Paterson won caps for Scotland while at Batley and Widnes 2007...present 3-caps
 Harry Rees
 Brinley Williams won caps for Wales while at Batley in 1921 against England and Australia, and won a cap for Other Nationalities while at Batley in 1921 against England
 Frederick Willis won a cap for Wales while at Batley in 1921

Other notable players

 Wilf Auty
 Keegan Hirst 
 F. T. Adams captain circa-1936
  Andrew Ballot (No. 13) circa-1990s
 Mark Barlow
 Trevor Barlow
 John Bell circa-1973
   Tommy "Dowdy" Brannan
   Tommy "Chick" Brannan
 Jack Briggs 1954–63
 David Brooke circa-1973
 Alex Brown
 Donald "Don" Burnell Yorkshire XIII 1947–48
 Graham Chalkley circa-1973
 Richard Colley
 Kevin Crouthers
 Wharton "Wattie" Davies 1896...1912
 Robin Dewhurst circa-1973
 Phil Doyle Yorkshire XIII 1969–70
  George Douglas, for Scotland (RU) while at Jed-Forest RFC (RU) 1921 1-cap (signed for Batley 1921–22)
 Eric Earnshaw
 Barry Eaton
 Danny Maun
 John Etty, for British Empire XIII while at Batley 1951 Wales XIII
 Jim Etty
 Bolu Fagborun
 Craig Farrell
 Dai Fitzgerald
 John Fox (Testimonial match 1979)
 Peter Fox
 Fred "Ted" Fozzard
 John Gallagher
 Jim Gath
 Ian Gelderd 
 Carl Gibson
 Harry Goodall
 John B "Jack" Goodall
 Jeff Grayshon
 Jonathan "Jon" Grayshon
 Ben Gronow
 Tommy Haslam 1888 British Isles tourist (RU)
 Samuel "Sam" Hargreaves Yorkshire XIII 1946–47
 Tom Hemingway
 Ernest "Ernie" Hepworth (Testimonial match 1978)
 David Heron
 Paul Hicks
 Philip "Phil" Holmes circa-1973
 John Jones circa-1980
 Arthur Keegan
 Robert Kelly
 Kevin King
 Dean Lawford
 Stephen "Steve" Lingard circa-1973
 Davide Longo
 George H. Main
 Francis Maloney
 Tommy Martyn
 Colin Maskill circa-1973
 Edward Melling circa-1920
 Luke Menzies
 James "Jim" Naylor Yorkshire XIII 1972–73
 Gareth Moore
 George Northern born circa-1927  and captain for Batley in 1954 and Doncaster from 1955 to 1963
 Joe Oakland
 Trevor Oldroyd circa-1973
 Lee Paterson
 Jackie Perry
 Roy Powell
 Richard Price circa-1998
 Sean Richardson
 William "Bill" Riches (Testimonial match 1952) Yorkshire 1946...52 (England v France 1946–47, "reserve to travel")
 Gus Risman
 Joe Robinson circa-1920
 Shad Royston
 Mark Scott (Testimonial match 1994)
 David "Dave" Secker circa-1973
 Malcolm Shuttleworth
  Herbert 'Dodger' Simms
 Roger Simpson
 Byron Smith
 Gilbert "Gil" Smith born circa-1925
 Andrew "Andy" Speak
 Timothy "Tim" Spears
 John Stainburn (Testimonial match 1993)
 George Standidge circa-1973
 Doug Stokes circa-1950s
 Paul Storey (Testimonial match 1988)
 Gary Thornton
 Glen Tomlinson
 Trevor 'Tank' Walker Left-
 Jim Waltham
 Alan Watts circa-1973
 John Westbury (#13) circa-1950s
 Clifford "Cliff" Williams circa-1973
 Martin Whelan 1970s–1980s

Past First Team Coaches

Seasons

Super League era

Honours
Major titles

Other titles

See also 
 Boxing Day Challenge: The annual friendly against local rivals Dewsbury Rams

Notes

References

External links 

 Batley Website
 B.I.S.S.A. – Batley Independent Supporters Squadbuilder Association
 Bulldogs: history and facts
 Batley Bulldogs forum on rlfans.com
 National League website
 Official Batley Bulldogs Fans Forums

 
English rugby league teams
Sport in Kirklees
Rugby clubs established in 1880
Founder members of the Northern Rugby Football Union